Harriet A. Drummond (born 1952) is an American politician and a  Democratic member of the Alaska House of Representatives since January 18, 2013 who has represented District 16. She ran to represent District 17 in the Alaska legislature and lost to William Fields, by 752 votes.

Education
Drummond earned her BS from Cornell University.

Elections
2012 With Republican Representative Bill Stoltze redistricted to District 11, Drummond won the District 16 August 28, 2012  Primary with 1,280 votes (88.58%), and won the three-way November 6, 2012 General election with 3,434 votes (56.45%) against Republican nominee Jimmy Crawford and Independent Phil Isley, who had run in the 2010 election.

References

External links
 Official page at the Alaska Legislature
 Campaign site
 
 Harriet Drummond at 100 Years of Alaska's Legislature

Anchorage Assembly members
Cornell University alumni
Living people
Democratic Party members of the Alaska House of Representatives
Place of birth missing (living people)
Women state legislators in Alaska
Women city councillors in Alaska
21st-century American politicians
21st-century American women politicians
1952 births
The Bronx High School of Science alumni